Bill Rowley was an Australian former professional rugby league footballer who played in the 1910s. He played for the South Sydney in the New South Wales Rugby League (NSWRL) competition.

Playing career
Rowley made his first grade debut for South Sydney in round 10 of the 1915 NSWRL season against Annandale which ended in a 3-2 loss at Erskineville Oval. In 1918, Rowley played 12 games for Souths as they won the 1918 premiership. Rowley then joined the South Sydney squad for their tour of Queensland in the same season. Rowley's final game for South Sydney was in round 9 of the 1919 NSWRL season against Annandale which Souths won 18-10 at Wentworth Park.

References

1889 births
South Sydney Rabbitohs players
Australian rugby league players
Rugby league centres
Year of death missing